Synaptoporin is a protein that in humans is encoded by the SYNPR gene.

References

Further reading